Durak (also Romanized as Dūrak; also known as Dowraj, Dūrak-e Fāj, and Dūrak-e Ghāch) is a village in Sardasht Rural District, in the Central District of Lordegan County, Chaharmahal and Bakhtiari Province, Iran. At the 2006 census, its population was 43, in 8 families. The village is populated by Lurs.

References 

Populated places in Lordegan County
Luri settlements in Chaharmahal and Bakhtiari Province